Lists of animated television series first aired in the 1990s organized by year:

List of animated television series of 1990
List of animated television series of 1991
List of animated television series of 1992
List of animated television series of 1993
List of animated television series of 1994
List of animated television series of 1995
List of animated television series of 1996
List of animated television series of 1997
List of animated television series of 1998
List of animated television series of 1999

1990s
 
Animated series 1990s